"Slipping Away" is a song by Max Merritt.  It was released as a single in 1975 by his then UK-based New Zealand group, Max Merritt and The Meteors. The second single from their album A Little Easier, it gave Max Merritt the biggest hit of his career in Oceania, peaking at #2 in Australia and #5 in New Zealand. “That song struck a chord with a lot of people," Max said, "and I’m very proud of it. It has been very good to me."

In July 2008, Merritt was inducted by Glenn A. Baker into the ARIA Hall of Fame. He was joined on-stage by Kasey Chambers and Bill Chambers to perform "Slipping Away".

Track listing
 1975 7" / 45 RPM single 
Side A: "Slipping Away" (Written by Max Merritt) - 5:28 
Side B: " I Keep Forgettin' " (Written by Leiber-Stoller) - 3:05

 1977 7" / 45 RPM Single
Side A: "You" (Written by Max Merritt) - 3:33 
Side B: "A Little Easier" (Written by Max Merritt) – 3:53

Charts

Weekly charts

Year-end charts

Cover versions
 In 1992, Gina Jeffreys released a version as her debut single. It was later included on her 2002 greatest hits album Best of Gina Jeffreys... So Far.
 In 1999, Margaret Urlich recorded a version for her album, Second Nature.
 In 2008, Brian Fraser recorded a version for his 2008 album, Don’t Ask Me.
 In 2013, Glenn Meade released a version as a single.
 In December 2020, Marcia Hines, Didirri, Andy Bull, Mia Wray and Russell Morris performed "Slippin' Away" on The Sound as a tribute to Max Merritt.

References

1975 songs
1975 singles
1977 singles
Max Merritt songs
Gina Jeffreys songs
Arista Records singles